The Middle Weser Region includes, in its fullest sense, the land along the Middle Weser between Minden and Bremen. It lies within the federal states of North Rhine-Westphalia, Lower Saxony and Bremen. However, the term is often used just to refer to the Lower Saxon part, because of the different political development of the three states and the cooperative associations formed in Lower Saxony some years ago (see below). The Lower Saxon part of the Middle Weser Region forms the geographical heart of this state. In the centre of the Middle Weser Region are the towns of Minden, Nienburg/Weser and Verden (Aller). In the extreme north, the city of Bremen, which is not part of Lower Saxony, has a very important influence on that area of Lower Saxony surrounding it.

For information about the Westphalian part of the Middle Weser Region see also Ostwestfalen-Lippe and Minden Land

Landscape 
The Middle Weser Region is part of the North German Plain. On either side of the Weser and its tributaries are broad marsh, geest (topography) and bog landscapes with original forests. Other parts of the region are used for  agriculture. The southern part of the Middle Weser Region belongs to the Middle Weser Valley which is joined by the glacial valley of the Aller in the north.

Historic territories 
 Bishopric of Verden
 Diocese of Minden
 County of Hoya
 Kingdom of Hanover
 Duchy of Brunswick
 Kingdom of Prussia
 County of Wölpe
 Bremen-Verden

Cuisine 

 Fish recipes using fish from the Weser and its tributaries
 Eel
 Trout
 Perch
 Carp
 Asparagus (Spargel)
 Potatoes and potato products
 Grünkohl and Pinkel
 Knipp
 Mustard (condiment) and vinegar from Eystrup
 Bilberries (Bickbeeren)

Tourist attractions 
 Town centres of Verden (Aller), Hoya, Nienburg/Weser, Petershagen and Minden
 Verden Cathedral
 Minden Cathedral
 Heritage railways of Bruchhausen-Vilsen, Thedinghausen and Verden (Aller)
 Car museum in Asendorf
 Spa facilities in Bad Rehburg
 Passenger boats on the Middle Weser
 Bücken church
 Loccum Abbey
 Erbhof Thedinghausen
 Etelsen Castle
 Petershagen Castle
 Herring fishing museum in Heimsen
 Meyersiek Mill (second oldest mill in Lower Saxony) in Steyerberg

Participating administrative bodies and communal associations 
 Bruchhausen-Vilsen (Samtgemeinde)
 Eystrup (Samtgemeinde)
 Grafschaft Hoya (Samtgemeinde)
 Heemsen (Samtgemeinde)
 Landesbergen (Samtgemeinde)
 Langwedel
 Nienburg/Weser
 Rehburg-Loccum
 Steimbke (Samtgemeinde)
 Steyerberg
 Stolzenau
 Thedinghausen (Samtgemeinde)
 Weser-Aue
 Nienburg district

Other administrative bodies in the Middle Weser Region 
 Achim
 Dörverden
 Uchte (Samtgemeinde)
 Verden (Aller)
 Petershagen
 Minden
 Minden-Lübbecke district
 Verden district

External links 
 Tourist pages
 Mittelweser.de

Regions of Lower Saxony
Geography of North Rhine-Westphalia